Zagračani is a village in the municipality of Struga, North Macedonia.

Demographics
The village of Zagračani is inhabited by Tosks, a subgroup of southern Albanians and speak the Tosk Albanian dialect. Amidst the Albanian population of Zagračani are a few Macedonian Muslim families originating from the villages of Oktisi and Podgorci who now speak Albanian.

As of the 2021 census, Zagračani had 736 residents with the following ethnic composition:
Albanians 719
Persons for whom data are taken from administrative sources 17

According to the 2002 census, the village had a total of 1,075 inhabitants. Ethnic groups in the village include:
Albanians: 1,071 (99.62%)
Macedonians: 1 (0.09%)
Others: 3 (0.27%)

Sports
Local football club KF Liria plays in the Macedonian Third League (Southwest Division).

References

Villages in Struga Municipality
Albanian communities in North Macedonia